Matt Gallop (born 10 November 1987) is a New Zealand international lawn and indoor bowler.

Bowls career
Gallop from Blenheim, in New Zealand won a bronze medal in the triples at the 2012 World Outdoor Bowls Championship in Adelaide.

He won the 2012/13 pairs title and 2010/11 fours title at the New Zealand National Bowls Championships when bowling for the Blenheim and Cabramatta Bowls Clubs respectively.

References 

1987 births
New Zealand male bowls players
Living people